S-adenosyl-L-methionine:N,N-dimethylglycine N-methyltransferase may refer to:

 Sarcosine/dimethylglycine N-methyltransferase
 Dimethylglycine N-methyltransferase